Omalodes grossus is a species of clown beetle in the family Histeridae. It is found in Central America and North America.

Subspecies
These two subspecies belong to the species Omalodes grossus:
 Omalodes grossus grossus Marseul, 1853
 Omalodes grossus lubricans Casey, 1893

References

Further reading

 

Histeridae
Articles created by Qbugbot
Beetles described in 1853